The women's javelin throw event at the 2016 IAAF World U20 Championships was held in Bydgoszcz, Poland, at Zdzisław Krzyszkowiak Stadium on 19 and 20 July.

Medalists

Results

Final
20 July

Qualifications
19 July
With qualifying standard of 53.50 (Q) or at least the 12 best performers (q) advance to the Final

Summary

Details
With qualifying standard of 53.50 (Q) or at least the 12 best performers (q) advance to the Final

Group A
19 July

Group B
19 July

References

Javelin throw
Javelin throw at the World Athletics U20 Championships
2016 in women's athletics